Park Halt railway station on the Middleton Railway in Leeds, West Yorkshire, England is the terminal station of the railway. It is situated next to Middleton Park. The halt was constructed so passengers could alight to walk around the reclaimed colliery site of Broom Pit and allow for the run-round of trains.
Park Halt is located near the John Charles Centre for Sport. The site consists of a platform with pedestrian access into the park.

External links 
Middleton Railway website

Heritage railway stations in Leeds
Railway stations built for UK heritage railways